East Suffolk County Council was the county council of the non-metropolitan county of East Suffolk in east England. It came into its powers on 1 April 1889 and acted as the governing authority for the county until it was amalgamated with West Suffolk County Council to form Suffolk County Council in 1974. The county council was based at East Suffolk County Hall in Ipswich.

References

Former county councils of England
1889 establishments in England
1974 disestablishments in England
History of Suffolk